Michael Holland Hobbiss (born 17 August 1985) is an English former first-class cricketer.

Hobbiss was born in August 1985 at Manchester. He later studied at Worcester College at the University of Oxford. While studying at Oxford, he made two appearances in first-class cricket for Oxford University against Cambridge University in The University Matches of 2006 and 2007, scoring an unbeaten 78 in the 2006 fixture.

After graduating from Oxford, he moved into teaching for eight years, before pursuing his PhD in neuroscience alongside Dr Nilli Lavie at University College London in 2015.

References

External links

1985 births
Living people
Cricketers from Manchester
Alumni of Worcester College, Oxford
English cricketers
Oxford University cricketers
English schoolteachers
Alumni of University College London